University of Science & Technology Chittagong (USTC) is a private university located in Chattogram, Bangladesh. At first, it was established with the sponsorship of a private charity on May 13, 1989. Later it was upgraded to USTC as a full phased university under the Private University Act of 1992.

History
When USTC began its journey in 1989, it had only two professors and nine lecturers. Now the number of full-time teachers is 285. USTC has 4,200 students. Among these,  over 30% are foreign students, from India, Nepal, Malaysia, Sri Lanka, Bhutan among others.

List of vice-chancellors 
 Prof.Dr.Engr.Jahangir Alam ( present )

Academics

Faculties and departments 
 Faculty Of Science, Engineering & Technology (FSET).
 Department of Computer Science & Engineering
 Department of Electrical & Electronics Engineering
 Department of Electric & Telecommunication Engineering
 Faculty of Basic Medical and Pharmaceutical Sciences.
 Department of Medicine [MBBS] 
 Department of Pharmacy
 Department of Biochemistry and Biotechnology.
 Faculty of Business Administration.
 Department of Business Administration
 Faculty of Social Science and Humanities.
 Department of English Language & Literature

Campus

Hospital
The university's 220-bed teaching hospital,  (BBMH), is the largest private hospital in Chittagong.

Library

USTC owns seven-storied library building. The library has three sections comprised by modern technology and has accommodation for 150 readers at a time. USTC provides well-stocked resources for its students in the library. They are as follows:
 Books 6791 +
 Journals 5021 +
 Books supplied by the British council Library on long-term loan, Chittagong 50 copies (renewable).
 Audio and Video Cassettes 100 +
 Reference resources 190 +

Accommodation
The university has a hostel:Gulmeher Hall for female students. It can accommodate both foreign and non-local female students.
There is one hostel available for male students - Syedur Rahman International Hall for foreign students which is located within the campus grounds.

Auditorium
One of the unique feature of USTC is about its auditorium. There is a gallery available for 1000 audience members. The auditorium is ideally suited for conference and seminar.

Extra curricular activities
The university has an arrangement of extra curricular activities for its students. Such as sports and games, debates, seminars and cultural activities. All extra curricular activities are held by Student Welfare Council of USTC.

References

External links
 USTC Official Website

Educational institutions established in 1989
Private universities in Bangladesh
Medical colleges in Bangladesh
Universities and colleges in Chittagong
1989 establishments in Bangladesh